Gilbert Stein (January 11, 1928 – March 24, 2022) was an American lawyer, law instructor, and professional ice hockey executive. Stein served with the National Hockey League (NHL) as vice-president and legal counsel for nearly 15 years before becoming the fifth and last president of the NHL in 1992.

Early life and career
Born in Philadelphia on January 11, 1928, Stein attended Temple University and studied law at Boston University. Before joining the NHL, Stein was Deputy District Attorney for Philadelphia, then worked for the Philadelphia Housing Authority and Labor Relations Board. After leaving the public sector, he joined a law firm, and then was hired by the Philadelphia Flyers where he served as chief operating officer and executive vice president.

NHL
He served as the National Hockey League's (NHL) general counsel and vice president under John Ziegler, Jr., and held that role for 15 years. In 1982, he appeared before a United States Senate committee to discuss retransmission of television signals by cable operators.

After the owners disliked the way that Ziegler handled the 1991-92 NHL strike, they desired to abolish the position of president in favor of having a commissioner. In the interim time needed to appoint an NHL Commissioner, Stein was appointed as NHL President. After taking over from Ziegler, Stein fired Brian O'Neill, the longtime overseer of league discipline, and took over the position himself. Stein then instituted a policy of suspending players on non-game days. Stein also attempted to block O'Neill's Hall of Fame candidacy. 

Stein also supported having NHL Players in the 1994 Winter Olympics as a way to grow NHL support in Europe. Two expansion teams came in the Mighty Ducks of Anaheim and Florida Panthers during his tenure. The announcement of the Panthers attracted the ire of Phil Esposito, president and general manager of the young Tampa Bay Lightning, as Stein initially told Esposito that no teams would be added until 1996, as the Lightning were supposed to have time to develop a fanbase in the state of Florida. Esposito criticized Stein for going after expansion fees without regard to long-term implications of franchise stability. 

Stein served as NHL president for a year until shortly after the owners appointed Gary Bettman to the newly created post of commissioner. Bettman took office on February 1, 1993; Stein served alongside Bettman until his term as president ended on July 1, 1993. He was then appointed a special advisor to Bettman.  In 1993, Stein was awarded the Lester Patrick Trophy for outstanding service to hockey in the United States. 

Stein was behind the Hall of Fame board while president, spearheading a change of the voting process by simple majority with no secret ballots. Stein was selected as the first member of this policy to the Hall of Fame, which attracted allegations that he manipulated his own induction; the Board did not speak with either the Board of Governors (headed by Bruce McNall, a friend of Stein) or Bettman, and Stein ultimately resigned his nomination and from the League. Along with Alan Eagleson, Stein is one of two people ever removed from the Hockey Hall of Fame.

Personal life
Stein was married to Barbara and they had three children. In his later years, he lived in an assisted living community in Gladwyne, Pennsylvania. Stein died from heart disease on March 24, 2022, at the age of 94.

References

Sources

 
 A Hall of Shame Candidate
 Is NHL ready for Stein
 Gil Stein (NHL President 1992-1993)

1928 births
2022 deaths
Jewish American sportspeople
Lester Patrick Trophy recipients
National Hockey League commissioners
Philadelphia Flyers executives
Lawyers from Philadelphia
Sportspeople from Philadelphia
Writers from Philadelphia
21st-century American Jews
Temple University alumni
Boston University School of Law alumni